The 13th Africa Movie Academy Awards ceremony was held on 15 July 2017 at Eko Hotel and Suites, Lagos, Nigeria.

Awards

Winners are listed first and highlighted in boldface.

References

2017 in Nigeria
Culture in Lagos State
21st century in Lagos
Africa Movie Academy Awards ceremonies
Events in Lagos
2017 film awards
2017 in Nigerian cinema
July 2017 events in Nigeria